Minna Kautsky, born Wilhelmine Jaich (11 June 1837, Graz - 20 December 1912, Berlin) was a Czech-Austrian actress and novelist who was strongly influenced by socialism and the women's movement. She often wrote under the pseudonyms "Eckert" and "Wilhelm Wiener".

Biography 
Her father, Anton Jaich, was a scenic designer. After 1845, the family lived in Prague. In 1854, she married Johann Kautsky, a landscape painter and set designer. They had a daughter and three sons, including Karl Kautsky, who would become a famous Marxist theoretician. Over the following years, she acted in Olmütz, Sondershausen, Güstrow, and at the National Theatre in Prague. In 1861, she was forced to give up acting, due to a lung disease. From 1863 to 1886, they lived in Vienna, where Johann had been appointed a decorative painter for the Vienna State Opera.

In 1870, she wrote an article in a clerical newspaper under the pseudonym "Eckert". Five years later, her son Karl introduced her to socialist ideas, which inspired articles in the Neuen Welt and Die Neue Zeit, all signed as "Wilhelm Wiener". In 1885, she paid a brief visit to Friedrich Engels in London. That same year, she joined the Vienna Writers and Artists' Association and served as its president from 1886 to 1887. About this time, she and Johann built a home in Sankt Gilgen, which they named the "Villa Kotzian". Many figures in the socialist movement were visitors there, including Wilhelm Liebknecht, Victor Adler, Franz Mehring and Rosa Luxemburg

From 1904, she divided her time between the villa and Karl's home in Berlin. She died in a hospital there, from pneumonia. Her remains were cremated.

Sources 
 Franz Mehring: Minna Kautsky. In: Die Neue Zeit. Wochenschrift der deutschen Sozialdemokratie, #31 1912/1913, Vol.1 pp. 457–458. (Online)
 Minna Kautsky. In: Der Wahre Jacob, Nr. 691, 11. Januar 1913, pg.7778. (Online)
 Kautsky, Minna. In: Lexikon sozialistischer deutscher Literatur. Von den Anfängen bis 1945. Monographisch-biographische Darstellungen. Leipzig 1963, pp. 278–280.
 
 "Kautsky, Minna (Ps. Eckert, Wilhelm Wiener)". In. Gisela Brinker-Gabler, Karola Ludwig, Angela Wöffen (Eds.): Lexikon deutschsprachiger Schriftstellerinnen 1800—1945. dtv, Munich 1986, pp. 155–156.

External links 
 Biography, works and photographs from Frauen in Bewegung 1848–1938 @ the Österreichische Nationalbibliothek 
 
 Biography @ the StifterHaus (Adalbert-Stifter-Institut)

1837 births
1912 deaths
Austrian actresses
Austrian women writers
Austrian socialists
Austrian novelists
Deaths from pneumonia in Germany
Writers from Graz